Highlands Elementary School may refer to:

In Canada 
Highlands Elementary School (Cranbrook), Cranbrook, British Columbia
Highlands Elementary School (North Vancouver), North Vancouver, British Columbia
Hart Highlands Elementary School, Prince George, British Columbia

In the United States 
Highlands Elementary School (Saugus, California), Santa Clarita, California
Monterey Highlands Elementary School, Monterey, California
Highlands Elementary School (Braintree, Massachusetts), Braintree, Massachusetts